"Good Enough" is a song by American rock band Evanescence. It was released in 2007 as the fourth and final single from their second studio album, The Open Door. The song was written by lead vocalist and pianist Amy Lee and produced by Dave Fortman. According to Lee it was written for her long-time friend and future husband, Josh Hartzler. It was placed as the last track on the album to symbolize a new beginning for Lee. 

The song is a piano ballad set in a moderately slow tempo featuring strings. "Good Enough" was critically acclaimed, with music critics praising its hopeful theme and Lee's composition. An accompanying music video, directed by Marc Webb and Rich Lee, was filmed in Budapest, Hungary, and released on September 10, 2007. It features Lee in a warehouse singing and playing the piano while surrounded by flames. "Good Enough" was part of the set-list during Evanescence's 2006 The Open Door Tour.

Background 

"Good Enough" was written by Amy Lee, partly inspired by her friend and husband, Josh Hartzler. It was produced by Dave Fortman and recorded in Record Plant Studios, Los Angeles. The single was scheduled for release in Germany in a basic and premium format on December 14, 2007, but a release date was never officially announced. While discussing Evanescences then upcoming album, The Open Door, Lee revealed that one of the tracks would be called "Good Enough". She said, "It's called 'Good Enough,' and it's completely, completely, completely different for me because it sort of [has a] happy ending. It's the last song that I wrote for the record, and it's sort of the bravest, I think, for me because I had to tell the truth and the truth is, I feel, good now. The rest of the album is pretty aggressive and dark and everything else, but the last one is like, I got to the good place that I was heading for and I wrote about how good I felt. It turned out amazing, but it's like nothing we've ever done. I just have to write from my heart and be genuine, because I think that's what people loved about our music to begin with, and if that changes, then that changes."

The song, which was the last one written for the album, was placed at the end of the album because it "marks a new beginning" for the band, which was the theme on the album and a theme in Lee's life. In an interview with VH1, Lee described the main inspiration behind the song, saying "I had gone through a lot of difficult things during the writing of the whole album, and by the end of it, I had stepped away from those bad situations. [...] After doing that, I felt so amazing. For the first time I felt like I could write a song based on how good I felt. I have never done that before ever. In another interview, she stated:

"That song -- the last one I wrote for the record -- is definitely the most representative of me now, the way that I feel. [...] You have to go through those things and make the changes you have to make and be there and go, 'Okay, I did it.' It doesn't come that easy. [...] I just didn't hold back this time, and writing that way has made me feel really purified, like I've actually gotten a chance to break through instead of just wallowing in all of my problems. It's not about all the times that I've been afraid and tormented and sad, it's about looking at those situations and stomping them out. It feels really good to sing these songs now."

Composition 
"Good Enough" is a moderately slow piano ballad with a happy theme. According to the sheet music published on the website Musicnotes.com by Alfred Music Publishing, the song is in a common time and performed in moderately slow tempo of 92 beats per minute. "Good Enough" begins in the key of F minor, later modulating into C minor and then finally landing and remaining in C major, while Lee's vocals for the song range from the musical note of G3 to the note of E5. The song contains strings, piano and Amy Lee's vocals as the main instrumentation. In "Good Enough", Lee "talks about the rapturous hold of something bigger than herself" in the text "Shouldn't have let you torture me so sweetly … / Shouldn't have let you conquer me completely / Now I can't let go of this dream / Can't believe that I feel / Good enough for you." In the song she also sings the lines "I'm still waiting for the rain to fall. Pour down real life on me/Cause I can't hold onto anything this good enough/Am I good enough/For you to love me too?".

Critical reception 

"Good Enough" received mostly positive reviews from music critics. In his review of The Open Door, Ed Thompson of the website IGN, stated that the fans who were "looking for the full-blown piano ballad" reminiscent of "My Immortal" (2004) had to wait until the album's final track. He added that at the end of the album they were awarded with "not only the most beautiful song on the album, but also the most unique song Lee has ever released." He further said, "despite Lee's voice giving the tune a funereal cast, there is no hiding the fact that the lyrics are of an upbeat nature. 'Shouldn't have to torture me so sweetly, now I can't let go of this dream, I can't breathe but I feel good enough, I feel good enough for you.'" Bill Lamb, of the website About.com, put the song in his list of Top Tracks from The Open Door along with "Sweet Sacrifice", "Call Me When You're Sober", "Your Star" and "Lacrymosa". Jon Dolan from Entertainment Weekly said that "[...] the deceptively soft 'Good Enough' flirts again with the dark side, offering 'Drink up sweet decadence / I can't say no to you' and striking a final note of cathartic badness." Kathy McCabe of The Daily Telegraph wrote that Lee's "newfound confidence" is evident in the song. In his review of The Open Door, Andree Farias of Christianity Today concluded that though the song "leaves a sweet taste in your mouth", it may not mean much in "a scheme." He added that the song stands as a contrast to everything else in the album.

A writer for The Boston Globe called the song a "lone glimmer in the gloom" with "incongruously downtrodden groove", adding that fans of Evanescence would like the song. Blabbermouth.nets Don Kaye found the song to be a "melancholy ballad". Richard Harrington of The Washington Post found some quiet moments on The Open Door most notably on the "haunting ballad 'Good Enough'" and on "Like You". Writing for the magazine St. Louis Post-Dispatch, Sara Berry concluded that the band balanced the "scorching rock anthems" with "reflective, piano-heavy ballads" like "Lithium" and "Good Enough". She further found an "intimate-sounding setting" which featured just Lee and her piano. The Providence Journals Rick Massimo, wrote that the song is "being rather melodramatic but melodically successful". Chris Harris of Rolling Stone wrote that Lee is "stroking the ivories and delivering her lyrics with an elegant sweetness" which he found reminiscent of Tori Amos and Sarah McLachlan. A writer for Reuters called the song "as intense and affecting as anything before it -- and this time, Amy Lee's lyric steps from the dark side, reveling in the relief of positivity."

Jason Nahrung of The Courier-Mail praised the song, calling it "sombrely arranged but lyrically uplifting". A writer for Blender was negative towards the song, writing "Tori Amos for junior high crybabies? We wish. 'Good Enough' is a piano ballad so formless and maudlin we were shocked it made the last Evanescence album – and now it's a single. How bad? Too corny for Vanessa Carlton, too sophomoric for Jewel, too whispy for Enya." Rob Sheffield of Rolling Stone wrote that in the song Lee sounds "like a very average Middle American girl who yearns to be 'Good Enough' but who suffers from an above-average attraction to magnetic and destructive dudes." A writer for Sputnikmusic praised the softness of the song giving it a grade of 4.5. Although Jordan Reimer of The Daily Princetonian praised the song, he added that it couldn't match "the haunting beauty" of "My Immortal". Stephen Thomas Erlewine of Allmusic found "Tori-isms" in the song.

Music video 
A music video directed by Marc Webb and Rich Lee was filmed in Budapest, Hungary between June 11 and June 14, 2007.  Lee made a guest appearance on MTV's Total Request Live (TRL) on September 10, 2007, to premier the video. A writer for MTV News found the video to be "dark and cinematic, it's almost as if you swallowed an entire feature length film in 3 minutes." Another writer for the rock magazine Blender was negative towards the video saying that it "makes singer Amy Lee's soul bearing that much more drawn-out with ill-advised slow motion shots of (yep) decay and destruction. (Oh, look at the record melt!) Redemption? You got it in the form of CGI tree roots, a breaking sunrise and a sudden wet t-shirt contest. And this is supposed to help the kids get over rough break-ups?"

The music video features Lee in a warehouse and begins with her burying a photograph beneath a hole in the floorboards. After she walks away singing "Under your spell again, I can't say no to you" while looking directly in the camera, the hole in the floorboard slowly covers up. As she walks by a bookcase, she touches the books placed on it and they start smoking. Then she goes to her desk to write in a diary, while the floorboards and items surrounding her begin to melt. After finishing with the writing, she walks by a mirror and takes a look at herself as it starts to melt. As she begins to play a baby grand piano, the piano and the room surrounding her begin to catch on fire until rain begins to fall and extinguishes the flames. The room appears to be burnt and wasted. As the sun begins to shine through the windows of the building, a small vine grows from the floorboard and expands across the room, and blue flowers begin to blossom from the vines above the piano.

As of April 2022, the song has 46 million views on YouTube.

Live performances 
"Good Enough" was performed live by the band at Hammerstein Ballroom in New York in 2006, at the Air Canada Centre in January, 2007, in Dunkin' Donuts Center in Providence, Rhode Island on April 4, 2007, and on November 21, 2007, at WaMu Theater. Evanescence also performed the song live at their secret New York City gig which took place on November 4, 2009. During their concert at War Memorial Auditorium in Nashville, Tennessee, on August 17, 2011, Evanescence performed "Good Enough" in promotion of their self-titled album, Evanescence.

Formats and track listings 
German CD single
 "Good Enough" (Radio edit)
 "Good Enough" (Acoustic from Intl Live)

Premium German maxi single
 "Good Enough" (Radio edit)
 "Good Enough" (Acoustic from Intl Live)
 "Your Star" (Live from Tokyo)
 "Good Enough" (Video)

Credits and personnel 
Credits for "Good Enough" are taken from The Open Door liner notes.

Amy Lee – writing, keyboards, vocals, assistant programming
Dave Fortman – producing, audio mixing
Jeremy Parker – audio engineering
Mike Houge – assistant engineering
Wesley Seidman – assistant engineering
Ted Jensen – audio mastering
DJ Lethal – programming

Recorded at Record Plant Studios, Los Angeles
Mixed at Ocean Way Studios, Los Angeles
Mastered at Sterling Sound, New York

References

External links 
 

Evanescence songs
2007 singles
2006 songs
2000s ballads
Rock ballads
Songs written by Amy Lee
Music videos directed by Marc Webb
Wind-up Records singles
Music videos directed by Rich Lee